Baqerabad (also Romanized as Bāqerābād) is a village in Rud Ab-e Sharqi Rural District, Rud Ab District, Narmashir County, Kerman Province, Iran. At the 2006 census, the population was 219, in 45 families.

References 

Populated places in Narmashir County